is a 1995 Japan-exclusive soccer-based video game released for the Super Famicom. The game features the Japanese super hero Ultraman, among other monsters and aliens.

Reception
On release, Famicom Tsūshin scored the game a 21 out of 40.

See also
 Battle Soccer: Field no Hasha
 Mega Man Soccer

References

External links
 Game overview 

1995 video games
Ultra Series video games
Association football video games
Fantasy sports video games
Japan-exclusive video games
Super Nintendo Entertainment System games
Super Nintendo Entertainment System-only games
Tom Create games
Yutaka games
Multiplayer and single-player video games
Video games developed in Japan